These are tables of congressional delegations from South Carolina to the United States House of Representatives and the United States Senate.

The current dean of the South Carolina delegation is Representative Jim Clyburn (SC-6), having served in the House since 1993.

U.S. House of Representatives

Current members
The current U.S. House delegation from South Carolina has 7 members, including 6 Republicans and 1 Democrat.

Historic representation

1789–1803

1803–1813

1813–1843

1843–1853

1853–1863

1863–1883

1883–1933

1933–present

United States Senate

Key

See also

List of United States congressional districts
South Carolina's congressional districts
Political party strength in South Carolina

Notes

References 

 
 
South Carolina
Politics of South Carolina
Congressional delegations